Nether Haddon is a sparsely populated village and civil parish in Derbyshire, England. It is immediately downstream along the River Wye from the small town of Bakewell and much of its land is owned by Haddon Hall, a medieval and Tudor building largely rendered in stone. The population of the village is included in the civil parish of Over Haddon.

Geography
Nether Haddon is centred on the River Wye north-west of the confluence of the tributary the River Lathkill, which marks part of the southern boundary. While it has no churches, Over Haddon to the west has two churches, a public house, and a car park.

The name "Haddon" means "Heath Hill", the "Nether" referring to being below "Over Haddon". Elevations reach 211 m above Ordnance Datum, just above headsprings in the north. In the east, before flowing into Rowsley, the Wye is at 106 m, which is similar to the Hall at the centre of the civil parish.

Transport
Road
It is astride the A6, which is not a dual carriageway in most of Derbyshire and is a hilly route across the Pennines, without major sections of cutting or embankment compared to the motorway and train network which provides higher speed.
Rail, by cycle and on foot
The Monsal Trail is a track which runs directly along the valley floor to north Derbyshire, past Haddon Hall very closely, passing through its grounds. It is in part the proposal of a reopening of a railway, to Bakewell from the current end of the Peak Railway at Rowsley.

The nearest railway is across the small town of Rowsley on Peak Rail, a steam and heritage diesel service chiefly for tourists and visitors. This station is its terminus, Rowsley South railway station.

Landmarks

No more than six farmhouses and the tightly packed cluster of mixed-size buildings at Haddon Hall comprise all of the permanent buildings in the parish.

Demography
It forms less than one hall of 2011 census output area E00099141 in terms of population, which includes most of Over Haddon which is larger in area and population. The proportion of properties rented and mortgaged in 2011 was below the national average, and the proportioned owned outright is greater than the national average.

See also

References

External links

The Peak District On-line, Over Haddon page
GENUKI page for Over and Nether Haddon

Villages in Derbyshire
Towns and villages of the Peak District
Derbyshire Dales